The 2018 FIVB Volleyball Men's World Championship featured 24 teams. Three places were allocated to the hosts, Italy and Bulgaria and the titleholder, Poland. The remaining 21 places were determined by a qualification process, in which entrants from among the other teams from the five FIVB confederations competed.

Qualified teams
 

Notes
1 Competed as SFR Yugoslavia from 1956 to 1990 and as Serbia and Montenegro (FR Yugoslavia) from 1994 to 2006; 3rd appearance as Serbia.
2 Competed as Soviet Union from 1949 to 1990; 7th appearance as Russia.

Qualification process
The distribution by confederation for the 2018 FIVB Volleyball Men's World Championship was:

 Asia and Oceania (AVC): 4 places
 Africa (CAVB): 3 places
 Europe (CEV): 7 places (+ Italy and Bulgaria qualified automatically as host nations and Poland qualified automatically as the reigning champions for a total of 10 places)
 South America (CSV): 2 places
 North America (NORCECA): 5 places

Summary of qualification

Note: CEV total includes +3 for Italy as co-hosts, Bulgaria as co-hosts, and Poland as reigning champions.

Confederation qualification

AVC

Teams

  (final round → Qualified)
  (Subzonal Round)
  (final round → Qualified)
  (Zonal Round → Final Round)
  (Zonal Round)
  (final round → Qualified)
  (final round → Qualified)
  (Zonal Round → Final Round)
  (Subzonal Round → Zonal Round)
  (Zonal Round)
  (Subzonal Round)
  (Zonal Round)
  (Zonal Round → Final Round)
  (Zonal Round)
  (Zonal Round → Final Round)
  (final round)
  (Zonal Round → Final Round)
  (Zonal Round)
  (Zonal Round)
  (Zonal Round)

Withdrawal
  (Subzonal Round)
  (Subzonal Round)
Suspension
  (Zonal Round)

Final positions (final round)
The draw for the second round was held on 19 March 2017, at the Dusit Princess Srinakarin Hotel in Bangkok, Thailand.

CAVB

Teams

  (first round → 2017 African Championship)
  (first round → 2017 African Championship)
  (2017 African Championship → Qualified)
  (first round → 2017 African Championship)
  (2017 African Championship)
  (first round → 2017 African Championship)
  (first round → 2017 African Championship)
  (2017 African Championship → Qualified)
  (first round → 2017 African Championship)
  (first round)
  (first round → 2017 African Championship)
  (first round → 2017 African Championship)
  (first round → 2017 African Championship)
  (first round → 2017 African Championship)
  (first round → 2017 African Championship)
  (first round → 2017 African Championship)
  (first round → 2017 African Championship)
  (first round)
  (first round)
  (2017 African Championship → Qualified)
  (first round)

Withdrawal
  (First Round)
  (First Round)
  (First Round)
  (First Round)
  (First Round)
  (First Round)
  (First Round)
  (First Round)
  (First Round)
  (First Round)
  (First Round)
  (First Round)
  (First Round)
  (2017 African Championship)
  (First Round)

Final positions (2017 African Championship)
Preliminary round

Play-offs semifinals
Winners qualified for Play-offs main round

|}

Play-offs main round
Winners qualified for 2018 World ChampionshipLosers qualified for Play-offs second round

|}

Play-offs second round
Winner qualified for 2018 World Championship

|}

CEV

Teams

  (first round)
  (second round)
  (second round)
  (second round → Third Round)
  (second round → Third Round → Qualified)
  (second round)
  (first round → Second Round)
  (second round)
  (second round)
  (second round → Third Round)
  (first round)
  (second round → Qualified)
  (second round → Qualified)
  (second round)
  (second round → Third Round)
  (second round)
  (second round)
  (first round → Second Round)
  (second round)
  (second round)
  (second round)
  (first round → Second Round)
  (second round)
  (second round)
  (second round → Qualified)
  (first round → Second Round)
  (second round)
  (second round)
  (second round)
  (second round → Qualified)
  (first round)
  (second round → Qualified)
  (second round → Third Round)
  (second round → Qualified)
  (second round → Third Round)
  (second round)
  (second round)
  (second round)
  (second round)

Final positions (second round)

Final positions (third round)

CSV

Teams

  (2017 South American Championship → Qualification Tournament → Qualified)
  (2017 South American Championship → Qualified)
  (2017 South American Championship → Qualification Tournament)
  (2017 South American Championship)
  (2017 South American Championship)
  (2017 South American Championship)
  (2017 South American Championship)
  (2017 South American Championship → Qualification Tournament)

Final positions (2017 South American Championship)
Preliminary round

Play-offs semifinals
Winners qualified for Play-offs final

|}

Play-offs final
Winners qualified for 2018 World Championship

|}

Final positions (qualification tournament)

NORCECA

Teams

  (first round → Second Round)
  (first round → Second Round)
  (first round)
  (first round → Second Round)
  (second round)
  (first round)
  (first round)
  (first round)
  (2017 NORCECA Championship → Qualified)
  (first round)
  (2017 NORCECA Championship)
  (final Four → Qualified)
  (first round → Second Round)
  (second round)
  (first round → 2017 NORCECA Championship → Qualified)
  (first round)
  (first round)
  (first round)
  (first round → 2017 NORCECA Championship → Final Four)
  (first round → Second Round)
  (first round)
  (first round → Second Round)
  (first round → Second Round → 2017 NORCECA Championship)
  (2017 NORCECA Championship → Final Four)
  (first round)
  (first round)
  (first round)
  (final Four → Qualified)
  (first round → Second Round)
  (second round → 2017 NORCECA Championship)
  (first round → Second Round)
  (first round → Second Round → 2017 NORCECA Championship)
  (first round)
  (first round → Second Round)
  (first round → Second Round)
  (second round → 2017 NORCECA Championship)
  (first round)
  (first round)
  (2017 NORCECA Championship → Qualified)

Withdrawal
  (First Round)
  (First Round)

Final positions (2017 NORCECA Championship)
Preliminary round

Play-offs semifinals
Winners qualified for Play-offs main round

|}

Play-offs main round
Winners qualified for 2018 World ChampionshipLosers qualified for Play-offs second round

|}

Play-offs second round
Winners qualified for 2018 World Championship

|}

Final positions (final four)

References

External links
Official website of the 2018 World Championship Qualification AVC Final Round
Official website of the 2018 World Championship Qualification AVC Southeastern Asia Zonal Round
Official website of the 2018 World Championship Qualification CEV
Official website of the 2018 World Championship Qualification CSV Qualification Tournament
Official website of the 2018 World Championship Qualification NORCECA Final Four
Official website of the 2018 World Championship Qualification NORCECA CAZOVA Second Round
Official website of the 2018 World Championship Qualification NORCECA ECVA Second Round Pool D
Official website of the 2018 World Championship Qualification NORCECA ECVA Second Round Pool E
Official website of the 2018 World Championship Qualification NORCECA First Round

2018 FIVB Volleyball Men's World Championship
FIVB Volleyball World Championship qualification